Santa Bárbara Sistemas is a Spanish defense contractor based in Madrid, integrated under the European Land Systems of General Dynamics. It is one of the primary suppliers of the Military of Spain and is responsible for the assembly of heavy vehicles such as the Spanish Army's Leopard 2E main battle tank and the Pizarro infantry combat vehicle. The primary lines of business of Santa Bárbara Sistemas are armoured vehicles, special and amphibious vehicles, weapons systems, munitions and missiles, and Research & Development. The company is delivering the prototypes of the UK's Scout SV AFV through General Dynamics in the UK.

General Dynamics acquired the company from the Spanish government 25 July 2001.

History

Santa Bárbara Sistemas was founded in 1960 by bringing together factories of the Spanish Ministry of Defense under the Instituto Nacional de Industria. These included arsenals in Seville, Oviedo, and Trubia.

Santa Bárbara Sistemas was denationationalised by Spain and acquired by General Dynamics Europe in July 2001.

Products and programmes

Weapons and systems
 Firearms:
 CETME - Assault rifle
 CETME Ameli - Light machine gun
 CETME L - Assault rifle
 LAG 40 - Automatic grenade launcher
 Artillery:
 Santa Bárbara Sistemas 155/52 SIAC
 Gun turrets:
 TC-25 - Turret
 TC-13 - Turret
 TC-3 - Turret
 TC-7 - Turret
 TC-19 - Turret
 TC-9 - Turret

Munitions and powders
 Powders
 Pólvora Dx
 Pólvora Esferoidal
 Munitions
 Artillery
 Small Caliber
 Medium Caliber
 Tank ammunitions
 Explosives
 Cutting and perforating explosives

Armoured vehicles
 Tracked Vehicles
 Pizarro - Infantry fighting vehicle
 Scout SV
 Wheeled Vehicles
 BMR- Vehículo blindado medio de ruedas
 Dragón AFV - Vehículo blindado medio sobre ruedas
 VEC- Vehículo blindado de exploración de caballería

Cooperative programs
 Armoured vehicles
 Leopardo 2E - Tank
 RG-31 Mk5E, local assembly of the units bought by the Spanish Army.
 AMX-30E - Tank
 Weapons and systems
 G36E - Assault rifle
 Mauser Mk30 - Automatic cannon
 MG3 - General purpose machine gun
 Heckler & Koch MG4 - Light machine gun
 Missiles
 Warhead and other system components
 Meteor program
 Anti-tank Missile Spike: Partial manufacture and assembly line of the missiles acquired by the Spanish Army and the Spanish Marines, under the license of Rafael Advanced Defense Systems Ltd.
 Civilian Sector
 Aeronautics
 Thermal and surface components

Modernisation programs
 Tanks
 AMX-30E
 M60 Patton
 Armoured vehicles
 BMR 2

References

External links
 Official web site 
 Official spanish site 
 Official german site 

Firearm manufacturers of Spain
Defence companies of Spain
Manufacturing companies based in Madrid
General Dynamics